Patrik Ringborg (born 1 November 1965) is a Swedish conductor, member of the Royal Swedish Academy of Music.

Career 
Born in Stockholm, as a student Ringborg attended the Adolf Fredrik's Music School in Stockholm. After studies at the Royal College of Music in Stockholm and with Kurt Bendix, Ringborg was a répétiteur at the Royal Swedish Opera in Stockholm from 1989 to 1993, also assisting the Music Director and conducting performances in the Royal Opera House. He also assisted the Music Directors at the Semperoper in Dresden (1988) and at the Canadian Opera Company (1992).

From 1993 to 1999, Ringborg worked as staff conductor with the Freiburg Opera, where his position in 1997 was elevated to Deputy Music Director. From 1997 to 2003, he conducted at the Aalto Theatre in Essen, where in 1999 he was appointed Principal Conductor. After Ringborg's first year in Essen, critics named him the "season's best conductor" together with John Fiore and Essen's music director Stefan Soltesz. Ringborg made his debut at the Gothenburg Opera in 1998 with Tannhäuser, and later was named its Principal Guest Conductor. There he also conducted the much acclaimed world premiere of Notorious by Hans Gefors in 2015. He also was the Artistic Director of the German Kurt Weill Festival 2000.

Until July 2007, Ringborg was chief conductor with the Freiburg Opera. With the 2007/2008 season, Ringborg became music director at the Staatstheater Kassel, where he also was the artistic director of the "Mahler-Festtage" (celebrated every second year in honour of the late Music Director in Kassel, Gustav Mahler) until 2017.

Ringborg led the Royal Stockholm Philharmonic Orchestra at the Nobel Prize Award Ceremony 2008, the last opera performances of Dame Kiri Te Kanawa in Cologne (Der Rosenkavalier, 2010), and conducted Elektra with the Stockholm Royal Opera at the Savonlinna Opera Festival in 2010.

As first conductor ever, Patrik Ringborg was awarded the Opera Prize, founded by renowned Swedish newspaper Svenska Dagbladet for the Swedish productions of Das Rheingold and Parsifal.

Selected opera productions 
Salome: Freiburg Theatre (concert), 1997
Cavalleria rusticana/Pagliacci: Gothenburg Opera, 1999
Faust: Aalto Theatre, Essen, 2000
Hänsel und Gretel: Aalto Theatre, Essen, 2000
Orpheus by Hans Werner Henze: Aalto Theatre, Essen, 2001
Manon Lescaut: Gothenburg Opera, 2002
Andrea Chénier: Aalto Theatre, Essen, 2003
Tristan und Isolde: Gothenburg Opera, 2003
Die Walküre: Gothenburg Opera, 2004
Lady Macbeth of the Mtsensk District: Deutsches Nationaltheater Weimar, 2006
Das Rheingold: Freiburg Theatre, 2006
Elektra: Freiburg Theatre, 2007
Peter Grimes: Kassel State Theatre
Tosca: Deutsches Nationaltheater Weimar, 2008
Salome: Kassel State Theatre, 2008
Dialogues des Carmélites: Kassel State Theatre, 2009
Elektra: Oslo Opera, 2009
Die Meistersinger von Nürnberg: Kassel State Theatre, 2010
Der Rosenkavalier: Cologne Opera, 2010
Lear: Kassel State Theatre, 2010
Lohengrin: Kassel State Theatre, 2011
Salome: Gothenburg Opera, 2011
Lady Macbeth of the Mtsensk District: Kassel State Theatre, 2011
The Magic Flute: Kassel State Theatre, 2011
Parsifal: Kassel State Theatre, 2012
Così fan tutte: Kassel State Theatre, 2012
Tannhäuser: Kassel State Theatre, 2013
Parsifal: Royal Opera Stockholm, 2013
Die Frau ohne Schatten: Kassel State Theatre, 2014
Der Rosenkavalier: Kassel State Theatre, 2014
Turandot: Kassel State Theatre, 2015
Notorious: Gothenburg Opera, World Première 2015
Die tote Stadt: Kassel State Theatre, 2016
Elektra: Kassel State Theatre, 2017
Ariadna auf Naxos: Gothenburg Opera, 2018
Autumnsonata: Malmö Opera, 2019

Selected recordings 
"Växlar". Stockholms Läns Blåsarsymfoniker. Conductor: Patrik Ringborg. Oeuvres for wind orchester from the 20th century by e.g. Hugo Alfvén, Anders Hillborg and Erland von Koch, Twin Music TMCD-18, 1993.
"Höga Visan". Sveriges Radios Symfoniorkester, Radiokören. Conductors: Patrik Ringborg, Mats Rondin and Manfred Honeck. Works by Natanael Berg, Phono Suecia PSCD 721, 2003.

References

Sources 
 wagnerspectrum. Werktreue bei Wagner. Der Dirigent Patrik Ringborg im Gespräch mit Egon Voss. Koenigshausen + Neumann Verlag 2005. 
 Nationalencyklopedin, Supplementband 3. Article "Patrik Ringborg". NE Förlag 1999. 
 Die Walküre by Richard Wagner. Act II, Schott Music 2004. ISMN M-001-12529-1
 Die Walküre by Richard Wagner. Act III, Schott Music 2005. ISMN M-001-12974-9
 A Gallery Carol av Patrik Ringborg. SK Förlag 1985. ISMN M-070-01675-9
 Europa Publications: International Who's Who in Classical Music 2003, 19th edition, Routledge, 2003. 980 p., 
 Ruth Renée Reif: Die Stuttgarter Philharmoniker, ein historisches Porträt, Tübingen: Silberburg-Verlag, 1999. 
 Swedish choral music, a selective catalogue, Stockholm: Svensk Musik, 1988, 60 p.

External links 
 Staatstheater Kassel German-language biography of Ringborg
 Website on the conductor Patrik Ringborg
 Patrik Ringborgs official Facebook page

1965 births
Living people
Musicians from Stockholm
Royal College of Music, Stockholm alumni
Swedish conductors (music)
Male conductors (music)
21st-century conductors (music)
21st-century Swedish male musicians